Donald John May (born January 3, 1946) is an American former professional basketball player who played college basketball at Dayton and was twice chosen as consensus second-team All-American (1967–1968). His professional career lasted from 1968 to 1975, and he played for the NBA champion New York Knicks in 1970.

Early life
Don May was born in Dayton, Ohio, one of seven children of Edward S. May and Stella (Streit) May, and attended Belmont High School, where he played alongside another future college All-American and NBA player, Bill Hosket. The two once combined for 88 points in one game (50 by Hosket, 38 by May). Belmont captured the 1964 Ohio state championship with ease, winning the state semifinal and final by 24 and 29 points, respectively. Coached by John Ross, the Bison went 26-1 (with the loss in overtime after both May and Hosket fouled out) and May and Hosket were the first teammates ever to be named first-team All-Ohio.

College career
The 6'4" forward attended the hometown University of Dayton. As a sophomore in 1965–66, he averaged 20.3 points and 11.4 rebounds per game as the Flyers went 23-6 and advanced to the NCAA Tournament Sweet Sixteen.

In his junior year of 1966–67, May increased his averages to 22.2 points and 16.7 rebounds per game as the Flyers went 25-6 and May was named consensus second-team All-American. The Flyers advanced to the NCAA tournament Final Four where, led by May's 34 points and 15 rebounds, they upset fourth-ranked North Carolina 76–62. In the NCAA title game, the Flyers fell to UCLA and future hall-of-famer Lew Alcindor despite May's 21 points and 17 rebounds.

As a senior, May averaged 23.4 points and 15.0 rebounds per game as the Flyers went 21-9. He was MVP of the 1967–1968 National Invitation Tournament (NIT), in which Dayton defeated the University of Kansas and its star guard Jo Jo White in the title game. May was again a consensus second-team All-American.

May's 1,980 career points and 1,301 rebounds are both second in Dayton history.

NBA career
May was selected in the third round of the 1968 NBA draft by the New York Knicks as well as in the third round of the 1968 ABA Draft by the Indiana Pacers. He signed with the Knicks.

May played seven seasons (1968–1975) in the National Basketball Association as a member of the New York Knicks, Buffalo Braves, Atlanta Hawks, Philadelphia 76ers, and Kansas City-Omaha Kings. He averaged 8.8 points per game in his career and won an NBA championship with the Knicks in 1970.

Personal life
May was elected to the University of Dayton Athletic Hall of Fame in 1974 and to the Ohio Basketball Hall of Fame in 2007. In 2010, he attended the 40th anniversary celebration of the New York Knicks 1970 NBA championship season.

References

External links
Don May at Basketball-Reference.com

1946 births
Living people
All-American college men's basketball players
American men's basketball players
Atlanta Hawks players
Basketball players from Dayton, Ohio
Buffalo Braves expansion draft picks
Buffalo Braves players
Dayton Flyers men's basketball players
Kansas City Kings players
New York Knicks draft picks
New York Knicks players
Philadelphia 76ers players
Small forwards